Johan Carl Christian Petersen (28 June 1813 – 24 June 1880) was a Danish seaman and interpreter who participated in several expeditions in Northern Canada and Greenland in search of the missing British explorer John Franklin.

Early life
Petersen was born in Copenhagen. At the age of about 20 he moved to Godhavn (now Qeqertarsuaq) in Greenland where he made a living as a carpenter and sailor. In 1841 he moved to Upernavik, at the time the most northern Danish colony in Greenland. There he married a Greenlandic Inuit woman and adopted their customs and way of living, in the process he became a quite skilled hunter, dog sledge driver, and observer.

Exploration
He worked on William Penny's Expedition (1850–51), Elisha Kane's Second Grinnell Expedition (1853–1855) into Kane Basin, Francis Leopold McClintock Expedition (1857) and Isaac Israel Hayes North Pole Expedition (1860–61). He wrote two books about these expeditions.

On Kane's expedition he worked together with the young Inuit Hans Hendrik, for whom Hans Island was named.

Death
After these expeditions, Petersen moved back to Denmark and died in Copenhagen, at the age of 66. Johan Petersen Fjord in Greenland is named after him.

Writing
 Erindringer fra Polarlandene optegnede af Carl Petersen, tolk ved Pennys og Kanes nordexpeditioner, 1850-55, Copenhagen, P.G. Philipsens Forlag, 1857.
 Den sidste Franklin-expedition med "Fox", Capt. M'Clintock, Copenhagen, F. Wøldikes Forlagsboghandel, 1860.

1813 births
1880 deaths
Danish sailors
Danish travel writers
People from Nuuk
Danish emigrants to Greenland